Bonavista—Gander—Grand Falls—Windsor (formerly Bonavista—Exploits) was a federal electoral district in Newfoundland and Labrador, Canada, that was represented in the House of Commons of Canada from 2004 until 2015.

81.0% of its population was Protestant, the highest proportion in Canada.  In the 2011 federal election, this riding had the highest percentage of Liberal votes in the nation, with nearly 60% of voters backing Liberal candidate Scott Simms.

Demographics

Ethnic groups: 
 98.4% White¹
 1.6% First Peoples

Immigrant population: 0.92%

Languages:² 
 97.0% English
 3.0% Bilingual

Religions: 
 81.0% Protestant
 16.4% Catholic
 1.9% No affiliation
 0.6% other Christian

The riding had the highest proportion of Protestants in Canada.

Post-secondary Education: 31.3% 
Average individual income: $19 829 
Average household income: $40 677 
Unemployment: 28.9%

¹ Statistics Canada's category of  "Non-visible minority" includes First Peoples (First Nations, Métis and Inuit), and has been reduced accordingly. 
² Based on ability to speak.

Geography

The neighbouring ridings were Avalon, Random—Burin—St. George's, and Humber—St. Barbe—Baie Verte.

According to Elections Canada, the geographic definition of this riding was:

 "All that area consisting of that part of the Island of Newfoundland lying generally easterly and northerly of a line described as follows: commencing at a point midway between the towns of Triton and Leading Tickles in Notre Dame Bay; thence southerly in said bay to Seal Bay; thence southerly in a straight line to Frozen Ocean Lake at approximate latitude 49°11'N and approximate longitude 55°41'W; thence westerly in a straight line to Hinds Lake; thence southerly in a straight line to the mouth of Lloyds River at the westernmost extremity of Red Indian Lake; thence southerly in a straight line to a point in Victoria Lake at latitude 48°15'N and approximate longitude 57°21'W; thence easterly to the intersection of the Trans-Canada Highway (Route No. 1) with Route No. 230; thence easterly along Route No. 230 to Route No. 230A; thence easterly in a straight line to Ocean Pond; thence southeasterly in a straight line to British Harbour at the entrance of Smith Sound on the north shoreline of Trinity Bay; thence southeasterly to said bay. Including Exploits Islands, North and South Twillingate Islands, New World Island, Change Islands, Fogo Island, Funk Island, Cottel Island and all other islands adjacent to the shoreline of the above-described area."

History

The electoral district was created in 2003: 68.6% from Gander—Grand Falls and 31.4% from Bonavista—Trinity—Conception. Following the 2012 electoral redistribution, this riding was dissolved and divided between Coast of Bays—Central—Notre Dame (67%) and Bonavista—Burin—Trinity (33%), with the new boundaries taking effect at the 2015 federal election.

Member of Parliament

This riding elected the following Members of Parliament:

Election results

Bonavista—Gander—Grand Falls—Windsor, 2003 Representation Order

Bonavista—Exploits, 2003 Representation Order

See also
 List of Canadian federal electoral districts
 Past Canadian electoral districts

References

Notes

External links
 Bonavista—Gander—Grand Falls—Windsor riding from Elections Canada
 Riding history for Bonavista—Exploits (2003–2004) from the Library of Parliament
 Riding history for Bonavista—Gander—Grand Falls—Windsor (2004– ) from the Library of Parliament
 Election Financial Reports from Elections Canada

Gander, Newfoundland and Labrador
Grand Falls-Windsor
Former federal electoral districts of Newfoundland and Labrador